The Chartered Institution of Railway Operators (founded in 1999 and registered in 2000 as the Institution of Railway Operators (IRO)) is the professional body for all those engaged or interested in railway operations and its allied disciplines. It exists for its members and the rail industry as a whole. It was awarded Chartered status on 1 October 2021.

Corporate member companies
Most of the current train and freight operating companies (TOCs & FOCs) in the UK fall into this category. Also included is the Heritage Railway Association(HRA).

Local sections 
The CIRO has a number of local sections in a number of countries.
Internationally, there are sections in:
 Australia
 Middle East
 South Africa
 United Kingdom
 Ireland
In the U.K.:

 Midlands
 North East
 North West & Wales
 Scotland
 South East
 South West

There is also a Young Operators section specialised for young people working on the national network and the Railway Engineers Forum (REF) which is a multi-disciplinary body drawn from Professional Institutions with strong railway interests.

Membership grades 
Membership grade is dependent on the individual member's experience and / or formal qualification.

 Affiliate Member
 Associate Member (awarded the post-nominal letters ACIRO)
 Member (awarded the post-nominal letters MCIRO)
 Fellow (awarded the post-nominal letters FCIRO)

Headquarters 
The headquarters of the CIRO is located in Stafford, West Midlands.

CIRO Learning & Development 
The CIRO has its own section for learning and development, and provides a means of competence certification for personnel undertaking work in the railway operations sector.  The CIRO promotes Learning & Development through Continuing Professional Development, the Mentoring Scheme and Academic Courses. The CIRO aims to provide a focus for raising standards through the use of Short Courses in a bespoke training portfolio and longer courses to educate Railway Operations Management to Certificate, Diploma and Degree level.

References

External links 
 CIRO website

2000 establishments in the United Kingdom
Organisations based in Staffordshire
Railway Operators
Rail infrastructure in the United Kingdom
Rail transport in Staffordshire
Rail transport operations
Stafford
Transport organisations based in the United Kingdom